Twin Creek is a ghost town in Hancock Township, Osborne County, Kansas, United States.

History
Twin Creek was issued a post office in 1872, which was discontinued in 1904. It was issued a new post office the following year, but this was itself discontinued in 1915. The population in 1910 was 95.

References

Former populated places in Osborne County, Kansas
Former populated places in Kansas